The enzyme ADP-dependent short-chain-acyl-CoA hydrolase (EC 3.1.2.18) catalyzes the reaction

acyl-CoA + H2O  CoA + a carboxylate

This enzyme belongs to the family of hydrolases, specifically those acting on thioester bonds.  The systematic name of this enzyme class is ADP-dependent-short-chain-acyl-CoA hydrolase. Other names in common use include short-chain acyl coenzyme A hydrolase, propionyl coenzyme A hydrolase, propionyl-CoA hydrolase, propionyl-CoA thioesterase, short-chain acyl-CoA hydrolase, and short-chain acyl-CoA thioesterase.  It employs one cofactor, ADP.  At least one compound, NADH is known to inhibit this enzyme.

References

 
 

EC 3.1.2
Enzymes of unknown structure